David Nathan Beratan (born 1958) is an American chemist and physicist, the R.J. Reynolds Professor of Chemistry at Duke University.  He has secondary appointments in the departments of Physics and Biochemistry.  He is the Director of the Center for Synthesizing Quantum Coherence, a NSF Phase I Center for Chemical Innovation.

Career
Beratan received his B.S. in Chemistry from Duke University, North Carolina in 1980. He began his studies in electron transfer theory at California Institute of Technology, where he earned his Ph.D. in 1986 working with John Hopfield. Upon completion of his Ph.D., he was a National Research Council Resident Research Associate at the Jet Propulsion Laboratory, and later a Member of the Technical Staff, and held a concurrent visiting appointment at Caltech’s Beckman Institute. At JPL, he developed the tunneling pathway model for biological electron transfer (with José Onuchic) and general principles for optimizing the nonlinear response of organic structures (with Joseph W Perry and Seth Marder).  In 1992, he was appointed Associate Professor of Chemistry at University of Pittsburgh, where he was promoted to full Professor in 1997.  At Pittsburgh he pioneered studies of DNA electron transfer, developed the foundations of inverse molecular design theory, and developed strategies to assign the absolute stereochemistries of natural products using theoretical calculations (with Peter Wipf) of optical rotations.  In 2001 he was appointed R.J. Reynolds Professor of Chemistry at Duke University, and he served as Chair of the Chemistry Department from 2004 - 2007.  At Duke, his studies have focused on novel electron transfer systems in biology, signatures of quantum coherence in chemistry, host-guest interactions, and inverse molecular design and library design (with Weitao Yang).

Current research
Ongoing studies in the Beratan lab target the design of molecular structures and assemblies to capture and convert solar energy, defining mechanisms of multi-electron redox catalysis, mapping charge transfer pathways and mechanisms in extremophiles, designing molecular structures that focus oscillator strength for light absorption, creating functional de novo proteins, enumerating diversity-oriented property-biased molecular libraries, exploring charge transfer over micrometer to centimeter distances in bacterial nanowires and bacterial cables, understanding how exciting molecular vibrations can change electron transport dynamics, and understanding the physical principles that underpin host-guest interactions.

Major publications
(Publications listed below have been cited more than 200 times)

A Migliore, NF Polizzi, MJ Therien, and DN Beratan, "Biochemistry and theory of proton-coupled electron transfer", Chem. Rev., 114, 3381-3465 (2014)
J Contreras-Garcia, ER Johnson, S Keinan, R Chaudret, J-P Piquemal, DN Beratan, and W Yang, "NCIPLOT: A program for plotting noncovalent interaction regions", J. Chem. Theory Comput., 7, 625-632 (2011)
J Lin, IA Balabin, and DN Beratan, "The nature of aqueous tunneling pathways between electron-transfer proteins", Science, 310, 1311-1313 (2005)
DN Beratan, S Priyadarshy, and SM Risser, "DNA: insulator or wire?", Chemistry & Biology, 4, 3-8 (1997)
S Priyadarshy, SM Risser, and DN Beratan, "DNA is not a molecular wire:  Protein-like electron-transfer predicted for an extended π-electron system", J. Phys. Chem., 100, 17678-17682 (1996),
JM Nocek, JS Zhou, S De Forest, S Priyadarshy, DN Beratan, JN Onuchic, and BM Hoffman, "Theory and practice of electron transfer within protein-protein complexes:  Application to the multidomain binding of cytochrom c by cytocrome c peroxidase", Chem. Rev., 96, 2459-2490 (1996)
S Priyadarshy, MJ Therien, and DN Beratan, "Acetylenyl-linked, porphyrin-bridged, donor-acceptor molecules:  A theoretical analysis of the molecular first hyperpolarizability in highly conjugated push-pull chromophore structures", J. Am. Chem. Soc., 118, 1504-1510 (1996)
DN Beratan, JN Onuchic, JR Winkler, and HB Gray, "Electron-tunneling pathways in proteins", Science, 258, 1740 (1992)
JN Onuchic, DN Beratan, JR Winkler, and HB Gray, "Pathway analysis of protein electron-transfer reactions", Annu. Rev. Biophys. Struct., 21, 349-377 (1992)
DN Beratan, JN Betts, and JN Onuchic, "Protein electron transfer rates set by the bridging secondary and tertiary structure", Science, 252, 1285-1288 (1991)
SR Marder, DN Beratan, and L-T Cheng, "Approaches for Optimizing the First Electronic Hyperpolarizability of Conjugated Organic Molecules", Science, 252, 103-106 (1991)
DN Beratan, JN Onuchic, JN Betts, BE Bowler, and HB Gray, "Electron tunneling pathways in ruthenated proteins", J. Am. Chem. Soc., 112, 7915-7921 (1990)
JN Onuchic and DN Beratan, "A predictive theoretical model for electron tunneling pathways in proteins", J. Chem. Phys., 92, 722 (1990)
DN Beratan, JN Onuchic and JJ Hopfield "Electron tunneling through covalent and noncovalent pathways in proteins", J. Chem. Phys., 86, 4488 (1987)
JN Onuchic, DN Beratan, and JJ Hopfield, "Some aspects of electron-transfer reaction dynamics", J. Phys. Chem., 90, 3707-3721 (1986)
DN Beratan and JJ Hopfield, "Calculation of tunneling matrix elements in rigid systems:  mixed-valence dithiaspirocyclobutane molecules", J. Am. Chem. Soc., 106, 1584-1594 (1984)

Awards and honors
 Morley Medal, American Chemical Society, Cleveland Section, 2021
 Cozzarelli Prize, Proceedings of the National Academy of Sciences of the United States of America, 2020
 Bourke Award of the Royal Society of Chemistry, 2019
 Murray Goodman Memorial Prize, 2018
 Florida Award, American Chemical Society, Florida Section, 2017
 Charles H. Herty Medal, American Chemical Society, Georgia Section, 2015
 Feynman Prize in Nanotechnology (Theory), Foresight Institute, 2013
 Elected Fellow, Royal Society of Chemistry, American Chemical Society, American Association for the Advancement of Science, and (in 2001) the American Physical Society
 J.S. Guggenheim Foundation Fellow, 1999-2000
 Ralph & Lucy Hirschmann Visiting Professorship, University of Pennsylvania, 2000
 NSF National Young Investigator, 1992-97

References

External links
 autobiography

1958 births
Living people
21st-century American chemists
Duke University Trinity College of Arts and Sciences alumni
California Institute of Technology alumni
Duke University faculty
Fellows of the Royal Society of Chemistry
Fellows of the American Physical Society
Fellows of the American Chemical Society
Fellows of the American Association for the Advancement of Science